Sheffield's Municipal elections were held on 10 May 1962. One- third of the council was up for election, as well as vacancies in Moor and Park. Previous to this election, there had been two by-elections in June for Hallam and Woodseats, which were safely held by the Conservatives. The election saw a record number of 84 candidates, with the Liberals contesting half of the city's wards and the Communists and the Union Movement over a third. The increased presence of the Liberals helped them to triple their vote on the previous year's, and nearly see to a gain in Hillsborough.  There were, however, no seats exchanged for the second year running. Turnout was 31.8%, down slightly on the previous year.

Election result

The result had the following consequences for the total number of seats on the Council after the elections:

Ward result

References

1962 English local elections
1962
1960s in Sheffield